Kamana Vareh Neiy is Maldivian comedy drama television series directed by Amjad Ibrahim. Developed by Television Maldives and written by Mariyam Moosa, it stars Ali Shameel, Sheela Najeeb and Fauziyya Hassan in main roles. The series follows the lives of three womanizers, Yoonus, Qadhir and Yahuya, who betray their devoted wives out of no respect.

Cast and characters

Main
 Ali Shameel as Yoonus
 Sheela Najeeb as Lubna
 Fauziyya Hassan as Kamana
 Mohamed Shavin as Mahil
 Hamid Wajeeh as Qadhir
 Ajuwad Waheed as Yahuya
 Hamid Ali as Aadhanu
 Khadheeja Ibrahim Didi as Muna; Mahil's girlfriend
 Koyya Hassan Manik as Hashim

Recurring
 Arifa Ibrahim as Fareedha; wife of Yahuya
 Sameema as Yoonus's mother
 Marikko as the daughter of Kamana and Yoonus
 Mohamed Vishan Aboobakuru as Mazin; son of Kamana and Yoonus
 Shadhiya as Yahuya's love interest
 Hussain Munawwar as Hussain; second eldest son of Kamana and Yoonus
 Mariyam Haleem as Rameeza; Aadhanu's wife
 Mohamed Manik as Fayaz; Lubna's boyfriend

Guest
 Mareena as Mareena; an actress (Episode 1)
 Sheereen Abdul Wahid as an actress (Episode 2)
 Ahmed Asim as an actor (Episode 2 and 4)
 Ahmed Ziya as a journalist (Episode 2)
 Saiman as Shivrin; a journalist (Episode 2)
 Mohamed Faisal as an actor (Episode 4)
 Ahmed Azmeel as an actor (Episode 4)
 Ali Ahmed as an actor (Episode 4)
 Haisham (Episode 4)
 Hamdhan Farooq as Hamdhan (Episode 5)
 Yoosuf Solih as a journalist (Episode 5)

Episodes

Soundtrack

References

Serial drama television series
Maldivian television shows